Stevelus is a genus of mites in the family Laelapidae.

Species
 Stevelus amiculus Hunter, 1963

References

Laelapidae